The following highways are numbered 59A:

United States
  Illinois Route 59A (former)
  New York State Route 59A (former)
  Oklahoma State Highway 59A

See also
 List of highways numbered 59